Ytterøy is a former municipality in the old Nord-Trøndelag county, Norway. The municipality existed from 1838 until its dissolution in 1964. Originally, it was a large municipality that encompassed the island of Ytterøya and parts of the mainland to the northwest of the island on the west side of the Trondheimsfjord. By 1964 when it was dissolved, Ytterøy only included the  island of Ytterøya. Since 1964, the island has been part of what is now the municipality of Levanger in Trøndelag county. The island is connected to the rest of Levanger by a ferry that crosses the Trondheimsfjord. The main church for the municipality was Ytterøy Church.

History

The prestegjeld of Ytterøy was established as a municipality on 1 January 1838 (see formannskapsdistrikt law). On 1 January 1867, the mainland part of the municipality was separated from Ytterøy to form the new municipality of Mosvik og Verran (population: 2,949). This left a much smaller municipality of Ytterøy with 1,499 residents living on the island of Ytterøya. During the 1960s, there were many municipal mergers across Norway due to the work of the Schei Committee. On 1 January 1964, the municipality of Ytterøy was merged with the neighboring municipality of Levanger. Prior to the merger, Ytterøy had 772 residents.

Name
The municipality (originally the parish) is named after the island of Ytterøya (or more recently ) since the first Ytterøy Church was built there. Thus the meaning of the name is "the outer island" (as opposed to the nearby Inderøy which means "the inner island"). Before the 20th century, the name was spelled Ytterøen.

Government
While it existed, this municipality was responsible for primary education (through 10th grade), outpatient health services, senior citizen services, unemployment, social services, zoning, economic development, and municipal roads. During its existence, this municipality was governed by a municipal council of elected representatives, which in turn elected a mayor.

Municipal council
The municipal council  of Ytterøy was made up of 13 representatives that were elected to four year terms. The party breakdown of the final municipal council was as follows:

Mayors
The mayors of Ytterøy:

 1837–1839: Anthon P. Jenssen 
 1840–1843: Anders Sandstad
 1844–1847: Anthon P. Jenssen
 1848–1851: Johannes Tørrissen Worum 
 1852–1855: Anders Sandstad
 1856–1859: Johannes Tørrissen Worum
 1860–1861: Anders Sandstad
 1862–1866: Benedict Jenssen
 1867–1871: Anders Sandstad
 1872–1873: John Guldahl
 1874–1875: Martinus Barstad
 1876–1881: John Guldahl
 1882–1884: Peder Sandstad (V)
 1885–1894: Anders Møen (V)
 1895–1902: Peder Sandstad (V)
 1903–1922: Anton Faanes (V)
 1923–1928: Sofus Vigen (H)
 1929–1931: John Vigen (H)
 1932–1937: Sofus Vigen (H)
 1938-1938: Johannes Stavrum (Bp)
 1938–1941: Ingmar Nøst (Bp)
 1942–1945: Nils Myhr (NS)
 1945–1955: Ingmar Nøst (Bp)
 1956–1963: Henrik J. Sandstad (Bp)

See also
List of former municipalities of Norway

References

Levanger
Former municipalities of Norway
1838 establishments in Norway
1964 disestablishments in Norway